The Steinhaus longimeter, patented by the professor Hugo Steinhaus, is an instrument used to measure the lengths of curves on maps.

Description 
It is a transparent sheet of three grids, turned against each other by 30 degrees, each consisting of parallel lines spaced at equal distances 3.82 mm. The measurement is done by counting crossings of the curve with grid lines. The number of crossings is the approximate length of the curve in millimetres.

The design of the Steinhaus longimeter can be seen as an application of the Crofton formula, according to which the length of a curve equals the expected number of times it is crossed by a random line.

See also 
 Opisometer, a mechanical device for measuring curve length by rolling a small wheel along the curve
 Dot planimeter, a similar transparency-based device for estimating area, based on Pick's theorem

References

Bibliography 

 Hugo Steinhaus: Zur Praxis der Rectification und zum Längenbegriff, Berichte der Sächsischen Akademie der Wissenschaften 82, 120–130, 1930.
 Hugo Steinhaus: Przeglad Geogr. 21, 1947.
 Hugo Steinhaus: Comptes Rendus Soc. des Sciences et des Lettres de Wrocław, Sér. B, 1949.
 Hugo Steinhaus: Length, shape and area, Colloquium Mathematicum 3(1), 1–13, 1954.
 Hugo Steinhaus: Mathematical Snapshots, 3rd ed. New York: Dover, pp. 105–110, 1999.

External links 
 Weisstein, Eric W. "Longimeter." From MathWorld — A Wolfram Web Resource.
 Information about patent (DRGM 1241513)
 Download a PDF recreation of the Longimeter

Mathematical tools
Cartography